The following is a list of dams in Kanagawa Prefecture, Japan.

List

See also

References 

Kanagawa